Teddy Bear is the English title of Miś , a 1981 Polish comedy film directed by Stanisław Bareja. Teddy Bear, along with The Cruise (Rejs), was a reflection of contemporary Polish society using surreal humor to somehow get past the censorship at the time. It gained cult status in its native country. Later, the film was reappraised by critics and it has been regarded as one of the best Polish films ever made.

Plot

Rysiek (Stanisław Tym, who also co-wrote the screenplay), the shrewd manager of a state-sponsored sports club, has to travel to London before his ex-wife Irena (Barbara Burska) gets there to collect a large sum of money from their joint savings account.

However, getting out of a communist country is never easy, even for a well-connected operator like Rysiek. After his wife destroys Rysiek's hard to get passport he is stranded in Warsaw while she's off to London. The circumstances force him to plot a Byzantine scheme with support of his equally cunning friend. Their plan involves a movie production as well as tracking down a look-alike (also played by Tym) to "borrow" their passport.

Hilarity ensues as Bareja gives the audience a guided tour of the corruption, absurd bureaucracy, pervasive bribery and flourishing black market that pervaded socialism in the People's Republic of Poland.

The titular (teddy) bear is a nickname given to the main character, but also a big straw-bear used in a corruption scheme. Perhaps playing on the well-established Russian Bear trope, Misha is the mascot of the 1980 Moscow Olympic Games, the same year as the film.

Cast

 Stanisław Tym as Ryszard Ochódzki and Stanisław Paluch
  as Irena Ochódzka
 Krystyna Podleska as Aleksandra Kozel
 Krzysztof Kowalewski as Jan Hochwander
 Bronisław Pawlik as Stuwała
  as herself
  as Irena Siwna
 Stanisław Mikulski as "Captain Ryś" a.k.a. "Wujek Dobra Rada" ("Uncle Good-Advice")
 Wojciech Pokora as Włodarczyk
  as a militiaman

See also 
Cinema of Poland
List of Polish language films

Sources

External links
 
 

1980 films
Films directed by Stanisław Bareja
Films set in Warsaw
Films set in Poland
1980s Polish-language films
Polish comedy films
1980 comedy films
Surrealist films